Promethium (61Pm) is an artificial element, except in trace quantities as a product of spontaneous fission of 238U and 235U and alpha decay of 151Eu, and thus a standard atomic weight cannot be given. Like all artificial elements, it has no stable isotopes. It was first synthesized in 1945.

Forty-one radioisotopes have been characterized, with the most stable being 145Pm with a half-life of 17.7 years, 146Pm with a half-life of 5.53 years, and 147Pm with a half-life of 2.6234 years. All of the remaining radioactive isotopes have half-lives that are less than 365 days, and the majority of these have half-lives that are less than 30 seconds. This element also has 18 meta states with the most stable being 148mPm (t1/2 41.29 days), 152m2Pm (t1/2 13.8 minutes) and 152mPm (t1/2 7.52 minutes).

The isotopes of promethium range in mass number from 126 to 166. The primary decay mode for 146Pm and lighter isotopes is electron capture, and the primary mode for heavier isotopes is beta decay. The primary decay products before 146Pm are isotopes of neodymium, and the primary products after are isotopes of samarium.

List of isotopes 

|-
| 126Pm
| style="text-align:right" | 61
| style="text-align:right" | 65
| 125.95752(54)#
| 0.5# s
|
|
|
|
|-
| 127Pm
| style="text-align:right" | 61
| style="text-align:right" | 66
| 126.95163(64)#
| 1# s
|
|
| 5/2+#
|
|-
| rowspan=2|128Pm
| rowspan=2 style="text-align:right" | 61
| rowspan=2 style="text-align:right" | 67
| rowspan=2|127.94842(43)#
| rowspan=2|1.0(3) s
| β+
| 128Nd
| rowspan=2|6+#
| rowspan=2|
|-
| p
| 127Nd
|-
| 129Pm
| style="text-align:right" | 61
| style="text-align:right" | 68
| 128.94316(43)#
| 3# s [>200 ns]
| β+
| 129Nd
| 5/2+#
|
|-
| rowspan=2|130Pm
| rowspan=2 style="text-align:right" | 61
| rowspan=2 style="text-align:right" | 69
| rowspan=2|129.94045(32)#
| rowspan=2|2.6(2) s
| β+
| 130Nd
| rowspan=2|(5+, 6+, 4+)
| rowspan=2|
|-
| β+, p (rare)
| 129Pr
|-
| rowspan=2|131Pm
| rowspan=2 style="text-align:right" | 61
| rowspan=2 style="text-align:right" | 70
| rowspan=2|130.93587(21)#
| rowspan=2|6.3(8) s
| β+, p
| 130Pr
| rowspan=2|5/2+#
| rowspan=2|
|-
| β+
| 131Nd
|-
| rowspan=2|132Pm
| rowspan=2 style="text-align:right" | 61
| rowspan=2 style="text-align:right" | 71
| rowspan=2|131.93375(21)#
| rowspan=2|6.2(6) s
| β+
| 132Nd
| rowspan=2|(3+)
| rowspan=2|
|-
| β+, p (5×10−5%)
| 131Pr
|-
| 133Pm
| style="text-align:right" | 61
| style="text-align:right" | 72
| 132.92978(5)
| 15(3) s
| β+
| 133Nd
| (3/2+)
|
|-
| rowspan=2 style="text-indent:1em" | 133mPm
| rowspan=2 colspan="3" style="text-indent:2em" | 130.4(10) keV
| rowspan=2|10# s
| β+
| 133Nd
| rowspan=2|(11/2−)
| rowspan=2|
|-
| IT
| 133Pm
|-
| 134Pm
| style="text-align:right" | 61
| style="text-align:right" | 73
| 133.92835(6)
| 22(1) s
| β+
| 134Nd
| (5+)
|
|-
| style="text-indent:1em" | 134mPm
| colspan="3" style="text-indent:2em" | 0(100)# keV
| ~5 s
| IT
| 134Pm
| (2+)
|
|-
| 135Pm
| style="text-align:right" | 61
| style="text-align:right" | 74
| 134.92488(6)
| 49(3) s
| β+
| 135Nd
| (5/2+, 3/2+)
|
|-
| style="text-indent:1em" | 135mPm
| colspan="3" style="text-indent:2em" | 50(100)# keV
| 40(3) s
| β+
| 135Nd
| (11/2−)
|
|-
| 136Pm
| style="text-align:right" | 61
| style="text-align:right" | 75
| 135.92357(8)
| 107(6) s
| β+
| 136Nd
| (5−)
|
|-
| style="text-indent:1em" | 136mPm
| colspan="3" style="text-indent:2em" | 130(120) keV
| 47(2) s
| β+
| 136Nd
| (2+)
|
|-
| 137Pm
| style="text-align:right" | 61
| style="text-align:right" | 76
| 136.920479(14)
| 2# min
| β+
| 137Nd
| 5/2+#
|
|-
| style="text-indent:1em" | 137mPm
| colspan="3" style="text-indent:2em" | 150(50) keV
| 2.4(1) min
| β+
| 137Nd
| 11/2−
|
|-
| 138Pm
| style="text-align:right" | 61
| style="text-align:right" | 77
| 137.919548(30)
| 10(2) s
| β+
| 138Nd
| 1+#
|
|-
| style="text-indent:1em" | 138mPm
| colspan="3" style="text-indent:2em" | 30(30) keV
| 3.24(5) min
| β+
| 138Nd
| 5−#
|
|-
| 139Pm
| style="text-align:right" | 61
| style="text-align:right" | 78
| 138.916804(14)
| 4.15(5) min
| β+
| 139Nd
| (5/2)+
|
|-
| rowspan=2 style="text-indent:1em" | 139mPm
| rowspan=2 colspan="3" style="text-indent:2em" | 188.7(3) keV
| rowspan=2|180(20) ms
| IT (99.83%)
| 139Pm
| rowspan=2|(11/2)−
| rowspan=2|
|-
| β+ (0.17%)
| 139Nd
|-
| 140Pm
| style="text-align:right" | 61
| style="text-align:right" | 79
| 139.91604(4)
| 9.2(2) s
| β+
| 140Nd
| 1+
|
|-
| style="text-indent:1em" | 140mPm
| colspan="3" style="text-indent:2em" | 420(40) keV
| 5.95(5) min
| β+
| 140Nd
| 8−
|
|-
| 141Pm
| style="text-align:right" | 61
| style="text-align:right" | 80
| 140.913555(15)
| 20.90(5) min
| β+
| 141Nd
| 5/2+
|
|-
| style="text-indent:1em" | 141m1Pm
| colspan="3" style="text-indent:2em" | 628.40(10) keV
| 630(20) ns
|
|
| 11/2−
|
|-
| style="text-indent:1em" | 141m2Pm
| colspan="3" style="text-indent:2em" | 2530.9(5) keV
| >2 µs
|
|
|
|
|-
| 142Pm
| style="text-align:right" | 61
| style="text-align:right" | 81
| 141.912874(27)
| 40.5(5) s
| β+
| 142Nd
| 1+
|
|-
| style="text-indent:1em" | 142mPm
| colspan="3" style="text-indent:2em" | 883.17(16) keV
| 2.0(2) ms
| IT
| 142Pm
| (8)−
|
|-
| 143Pm
| style="text-align:right" | 61
| style="text-align:right" | 82
| 142.910933(4)
| 265(7) d
| β+
| 143Nd
| 5/2+
|
|-
| 144Pm
| style="text-align:right" | 61
| style="text-align:right" | 83
| 143.912591(3)
| 363(14) d
| β+
| 144Nd
| 5−
|
|-
| style="text-indent:1em" | 144m1Pm
| colspan="3" style="text-indent:2em" | 840.90(5) keV
| 780(200) ns
|
|
| (9)+
|
|-
| style="text-indent:1em" | 144m2Pm
| colspan="3" style="text-indent:2em" | 8595.8(22) keV
| ~2.7 µs
|
|
| (27+)
|
|-
| rowspan=2|145Pm
| rowspan=2 style="text-align:right" | 61
| rowspan=2 style="text-align:right" | 84
| rowspan=2|144.912749(3)
| rowspan=2|17.7(4) y
| EC
| 145Nd
| rowspan=2|5/2+
| rowspan=2|
|-
| α (2.8×10−7%)
| 141Pr
|-
| rowspan=2|146Pm
| rowspan=2 style="text-align:right" | 61
| rowspan=2 style="text-align:right" | 85
| rowspan=2|145.914696(5)
| rowspan=2|5.53(5) y
| EC (66%)
| 146Nd
| rowspan=2|3−
| rowspan=2|
|-
| β− (34%)
| 146Sm
|-
| 147Pm
| style="text-align:right" | 61
| style="text-align:right" | 86
| 146.9151385(26)
| 2.6234(2) y
| β−
| 147Sm
| 7/2+
| Trace
|-
| 148Pm
| style="text-align:right" | 61
| style="text-align:right" | 87
| 147.917475(7)
| 5.368(2) d
| β−
| 148Sm
| 1−
|
|-
| rowspan=2 style="text-indent:1em" | 148mPm
| rowspan=2 colspan="3" style="text-indent:2em" | 137.9(3) keV
| rowspan=2|41.29(11) d
| β− (95%)
| 148Sm
| rowspan=2|5−, 6−
| rowspan=2|
|-
| IT (5%)
| 148Pm
|-
| 149Pm
| style="text-align:right" | 61
| style="text-align:right" | 88
| 148.918334(4)
| 53.08(5) h
| β−
| 149Sm
| 7/2+
|
|-
| style="text-indent:1em" | 149mPm
| colspan="3" style="text-indent:2em" | 240.214(7) keV
| 35(3) µs
|
|
| 11/2−
|
|-
| 150Pm
| style="text-align:right" | 61
| style="text-align:right" | 89
| 149.920984(22)
| 2.68(2) h
| β−
| 150Sm
| (1−)
|
|-
| 151Pm
| style="text-align:right" | 61
| style="text-align:right" | 90
| 150.921207(6)
| 28.40(4) h
| β−
| 151Sm
| 5/2+
|
|-
| 152Pm
| style="text-align:right" | 61
| style="text-align:right" | 91
| 151.923497(28)
| 4.12(8) min
| β−
| 152Sm
| 1+
|
|-
| style="text-indent:1em" | 152m1Pm
| colspan="3" style="text-indent:2em" | 140(90) keV
| 7.52(8) min
|
|
| 4−
|
|-
| style="text-indent:1em" | 152m2Pm
| colspan="3" style="text-indent:2em" | 250(150)# keV
| 13.8(2) min
|
|
| (8)
|
|-
| 153Pm
| style="text-align:right" | 61
| style="text-align:right" | 92
| 152.924117(12)
| 5.25(2) min
| β−
| 153Sm
| 5/2−
|
|-
| 154Pm
| style="text-align:right" | 61
| style="text-align:right" | 93
| 153.92646(5)
| 1.73(10) min
| β−
| 154Sm
| (0, 1)
|-
| style="text-indent:1em" | 154mPm
| colspan="3" style="text-indent:2em" | 120(120) keV
| 2.68(7) min
| β−
| 154Sm
| (3, 4)
|
|-
| 155Pm
| style="text-align:right" | 61
| style="text-align:right" | 94
| 154.92810(3)
| 41.5(2) s
| β−
| 155Sm
| (5/2−)
|
|-
| 156Pm
| style="text-align:right" | 61
| style="text-align:right" | 95
| 155.93106(4)
| 26.70(10) s
| β−
| 156Sm
| 4−
|
|-
| 157Pm
| style="text-align:right" | 61
| style="text-align:right" | 96
| 156.93304(12)
| 10.56(10) s
| β−
| 157Sm
| (5/2−)
|
|-
| 158Pm
| style="text-align:right" | 61
| style="text-align:right" | 97
| 157.93656(14)
| 4.8(5) s
| β−
| 158Sm
|
|
|-
| 159Pm
| style="text-align:right" | 61
| style="text-align:right" | 98
| 158.93897(21)#
| 
| β−
| 159Sm
| 5/2−#
|
|-
| 160Pm
| style="text-align:right" | 61
| style="text-align:right" | 99
| 159.94299(32)#
| 
| β−
| 160Sm
|
|
|-
| rowspan=2|161Pm
| rowspan=2 style="text-align:right" | 61
| rowspan=2 style="text-align:right" | 100
| rowspan=2|160.94586(54)#
| rowspan=2|
| β− (98.91%)
| 161Sm
| rowspan=2|5/2−#
| rowspan=2|
|-
| β−, n (1.09%)
| 160Sm
|-
| rowspan=2|162Pm
| rowspan=2 style="text-align:right" | 61
| rowspan=2 style="text-align:right" | 101
| rowspan=2|161.95029(75)#
| rowspan=2|
| β− (98.21%)
| 162Sm
| rowspan=2|
| rowspan=2|
|-
| β−, n (1.79%)
| 161Sm
|-
| rowspan=2|163Pm
| rowspan=2 style="text-align:right" | 61
| rowspan=2 style="text-align:right" | 102
| rowspan=2|162.95368(86)#
| rowspan=2|
| β− (95%)
| 163Sm
| rowspan=2|5/2−#
| rowspan=2|
|-
| β−, n (1.79%)
| 162Sm
|-
| rowspan=2|164Pm
| rowspan=2 style="text-align:right" | 61
| rowspan=2 style="text-align:right" | 103
| rowspan=2|
| rowspan=2|
| β− (93.82%)
| 164Sm
| rowspan=2|
| rowspan=2|
|-
| β−, n (6.18%)
| 163Sm
|-
| rowspan=2|165Pm
| rowspan=2 style="text-align:right" | 61
| rowspan=2 style="text-align:right" | 104
| rowspan=2|
| rowspan=2|
| β− (86.74%)
| 165Sm
| rowspan=2|
| rowspan=2|
|-
| β−, n (13.26%)
| 164Sm
|-
| rowspan=2|166Pm
| rowspan=2 style="text-align:right" | 61
| rowspan=2 style="text-align:right" | 105
| rowspan=2|
| rowspan=2|
| β−
| 166Sm
| rowspan=2|
| rowspan=2|
|-
| β−, n
| 165Sm

Stability of promethium isotopes
Promethium is one of the two elements of the first 82 elements that have no stable isotopes; the other is technetium (Z = 43). This is a rarely occurring effect of the liquid drop model.

Promethium-147 
Promethium-147 has a half-life of 2.62 years, and is a fission product produced in nuclear reactors via beta decay from neodymium-147. The isotopes 142Nd, 143Nd, 144Nd, 145Nd, 146Nd, 148Nd, and 150Nd are either stable or nearly so, so the isotopes of promethium with those masses cannot be produced by beta decay and therefore are not fission products in significant quantities. 149Pm and 151Pm have half-lives of only 53.08 and 28.40 hours, so are not found in spent nuclear fuel that has been cooled for months or years. It is found naturally mostly from the spontaneous fission of uranium-238 and less often from the alpha decay of europium-151.

Promethium-147 is used as a beta particle source and a radioisotope thermoelectric generator (RTG) fuel; its power density is about 2 watts per gram. Mixed with a phosphor, it was used to illuminate Apollo Lunar Module electrical switch tips and painted on control panels of the Lunar Roving Vehicle.

References 

 Isotope masses from:

 Isotopic compositions and standard atomic masses from:

 Half-life, spin, and isomer data selected from the following sources.

 
Promethium
Promethium